John Cowper may refer to:

John Cowper (MP), MP for Petersfield
 John Sedgwick Cowper, member of the Legislative Assembly of British Columbia

See also
John Cooper (disambiguation)